Club Deportivo Varea is a Spanish football team based in Varea, La Rioja, Logroño in the autonomous community of La Rioja. Founded in 1967 and refounded in 2009, it plays in Tercera División RFEF – Group 16, holding home games at Estadio Municipal de Varea, with a 2,000-seat capacity.

History
Club Deportivo Varea played the first 36 years of its existence in the regional leagues (safe for a short five-year spell in Tercera División).

In 2008–09, the club first achieved promotion to the third division. Shortly before the beginning of the following season, its seat was sold to UD Logroñés, in view of a better representation of the Rioja region. However, only a few months later, it was refounded, and started competing again in Preferente (fifth level), returning to the fourth division at the first attempt. In the 2018-19 season the club finished 6th in the Tercera División, Group 16.

Season to season

CD Varea (1967)

CD Varea (1982)

11 seasons in Tercera División

CD Varea (2009)

11 seasons in Tercera División
1 season in Tercera División RFEF

References

External links
Official website  
Futbolme team profile  

Football clubs in La Rioja (Spain)
Sport in Logroño
Association football clubs established in 1967
1967 establishments in Spain